The Watershed Center Grand Traverse Bay was founded in 1990.  This non-profit organization advocates for clean water in Grand Traverse Bay and protects and preserves the Bay's watershed.

This environmental organization's work encompasses Leelanau County, Grand Traverse County, Antrim County and Kalkaska County in Michigan.  The group is based in Traverse City.

Programs 

Watershed Protection Plan: The Plan summarizes existing water quality conditions in and around Grand Traverse Bay and makes recommendations about how to improve and protect the bay and its watershed.

Grand Traverse Baykeeper: The Watershed Center is a member of the international Waterkeeper Alliance, founded by Robert F. Kennedy, Jr.

Adopt-A-Stream: This ongoing citizen based volunteer monitoring program samples aquatic insects and documents present stream conditions in the spring and fall of each year. Volunteers are led by a trained volunteer team leader.

Healthy Beaches: Swimmers can become ill from coming into contact with pathogens associated with E. coli, such as salmonella and giardia. East Bay is on the state's list of impaired waterways due to high levels of E. coli. The Healthy Beaches campaign works to reduce these pathogens and related beach advisories for Grand Traverse Bay.

Buffer Initiative: Vegetative buffers, also called riparian buffer zones, buffer strips or greenbelts, located between land and water help filter pollutants and improve water quality. Buffers absorb excessive stormwater runoff and nutrients such as phosphorus, a culprit behind algae blooms. The Watershed Center conducts buffer surveys of private and public lands, and educates the public about the aesthetic and water quality benefits of greenbelt gardens.

Beach Rangers: The Beach Ranger program mobilizes volunteers in response to bird die-offs from avian botulism. Bird die-offs have dramatically increased in recent years on northern Lake Michigan. In 2007, for the first time in several years, botulism was also confirmed in bird deaths on Grand Traverse Bay north of Elk Rapids. In response to these concerns and to better inform the public about how to help manage these outbreaks along the more than 400 miles of northern Lake Michigan shoreline, the Watershed Center is leading the Grand Traverse Bay Botulism Network. The purpose of the network is to monitor beaches along northern Lake Michigan and to respond to avian botulism outbreaks. The work of the network actively supports conducting botulism research.

Stormwater Reduction: Stormwater is a type of runoff that collects on paved areas following precipitation. Runoff increases erosion, which results in more sediment flowing to Grand Traverse Bay. Excessive sediment from erosion, along with nutrients such as phosphorus from fertilizers, are the top two water quality threats to Grand Traverse Bay. Effectively managing stormwater reduces sediment and phosphorus from reaching the Bay. It also keeps Grand Traverse Bay oligotrophic, meaning cold. Stormwater that runs over paved areas and land becomes warmer. Effective stormwater management reduces such thermal pollution, which is important for cold water species such as Lake Trout. The group works very closely with the City of Traverse City, numerous townships, and scores of project partners and volunteers from myriad organizations and businesses throughout the Grand Traverse region to protect Grand Traverse Bay from stormwater pollution.

Macrophyte Bed Study: Macrophytes include rooted aquatic plants such as cladophora and algae such as chara, both of which are on the rise in Grand Traverse Bay. Scientists believe decaying cladophora on lake bottoms is linked to avian botulism, the culprit behind thousands of bird deaths in Great Lakes in recent years. The study utilizes aerial photography and its Bay Monitor tugboat to locate macrophyte beds in Grand Traverse Bay, noting water quality, sediment, phosphorus, zebra mussels and quagga mussels.  This study will produce hard data to help scientists ascertain the link between macrophyte bed growth, phosphorus cycling and invasive mussels.

Water Quality Monitoring: Ongoing water quality monitoring is vital to measuring the health of the bay and developing trends. The organization coordinates a variety of different monitoring projects including stream and beach E.Coli testing, water clarity monitoring in Grand Traverse Bay, and various volunteer monitoring projects.

Water Quality Database: The online, interactive regional Water Quality Database for the Grand Traverse Bay Watershed is a storehouse of available water quality data for the entire watershed. The database contains both current and historical data that has been gathered and entered by groups involved in monitoring water quality throughout the watershed. Data can be searched by parameter, location, water body, jurisdiction, or specific research document.

References 
www.gtbay.org

External links
Watershed Center Grand Traverse Bay
Waterkeeper Alliance

Environmental organizations based in Michigan
Water organizations in the United States
Traverse City, Michigan